Black ring may refer to:

 a ring with a black gemstone
 black ring, a 5-dimensional solution, see  higher-dimensional Einstein gravity
 Black-ringed white-eye
 Tomato black ring virus
 the Black Ring, a magic ring from Conan the Adventurer
 Black power ring of the Black Lantern Corps
 the rings of power of the Nazgûl

See also
 Horrors of the Black Ring